Daria Eva Bijak (born 12 November 1985 in Racibórz, Poland) is a former artistic gymnast representing Germany. She is a two-time German national champion (2005, 2006) and competed for Germany at the 2002, 2003, 2005, and 2006 World Artistic Gymnastics Championships. Her best all-around finish was 8th in 2005.

Bijak was raised in Greven, Germany, and trained at the Deutsche Sporthochschule in Cologne under Shanna Polyakova. She went on to compete in the NCAA as a member of the University of Utah gymnastics team.

In 2008, Bijak represented Germany at the Olympic Games in Beijing, where she finished 51st in the all-around.

References

1985 births
Living people
German female artistic gymnasts
People from Racibórz
Polish emigrants to Germany
Gymnasts at the 2008 Summer Olympics
Olympic gymnasts of Germany
Utah Red Rocks gymnasts